Pelawal (also known as Palawa) is a census town in the Katkamsandi CD block in the Hazaribagh Sadar subdivision of the Hazaribagh district in the Indian state of Jharkhand.

Geography

Location
Palawa is not shown in Google maps. As per the map of Katkamsandi CD Block on page 116 of District Census Handbook Hazaribagh 2011, the location of Pelawa is same as that of Pelawal in Google maps.

Civic administration

Police out-post
Pelawal police out-post serves the Katkamsandi CD block.

Demographics
According to the 2011 Census of India, Palawa had a total population of 14,848, of which 7,701 (52%) were males and 7,147 (48%) were females. Population in the age range 0–6 years was 2,450. The total number of literate persons in Palawa was 9,503 (76.65% of the population over 6 years).

 India census, Palawa had a population of 9,757. Males constitute 53% of the population and females 47%. Palawa has an average literacy rate of 60%, higher than the national average of 59.5%. Male literacy is 66%, and female literacy is 53%. In Palawa, 19% of the population is under 6 years of age.

Infrastructure
According to the District Census Handbook 2011, Hazaribagh, Palawa covered an area of 1.61 km2. Among the civic amenities, it had 5 km roads with open drains, the protected water supply involved uncovered well, hand pump. It had 2,025 domestic electric connections, 40 road lighting points. Among the educational facilities it had 7 primary schools, 6 middle schools, 1 secondary school, other educational facilities at Hazaribagh 5 km away. An important commodity it manufactured was bidi. It had offices of 1 nationalised bank, 1 agricultural credit society, 1 non-agricultural credit society.

Transport
Pelawal is on the Hazaribagh-Katkamsandi Road, located between Hazaribagh and Chharwa Dam.

References

Cities and towns in Hazaribagh district